Janica Kostelić (born 5 January 1982) is a Croatian former alpine ski racer. She is a four-time Olympic gold medalist. In addition to the Olympics, she won five gold medals at the World Championships. In World Cup competition, she won thirty individual races, three overall titles, three slalom titles, and four combined titles. Kostelic's accomplishments in professional skiing have led some commentators, writers, and fellow ski racers to regard her as the greatest female ski racer of all time.

Biography
Kostelić is the only woman to win four gold medals in alpine skiing at the Winter Olympics (in 2002 and 2006), and the only woman to win three alpine skiing gold medals in one Olympics (2002).

Kostelić was the World Cup overall champion in 2001, 2003 and 2006. On 15 January 2006, Kostelić became the third woman in World Cup history (after Swede Pernilla Wiberg and Austrian Petra Kronberger) to win World Cup races in all of the sport's five disciplines. On 5 February 2006 Kostelić became the second female skier (after Petra Kronberger) to win all five disciplines in one season.

In the summer of 2006, she decided to not compete in the 2007 season, due to chronic knee and back pain. She had endured ten knee surgeries and thyroid surgery during her career. Following a year away from competition, Kostelić announced her retirement from racing in April 2007, at just 25 years old.

Since 2016, Kostelić has been the State Secretary for Science, Education and Sports in the Croatian Government.

Career

Early years
Born in Zagreb, Croatia, then part of Yugoslavia, into a winter sports family, Kostelić's father Ante was also her trainer. Her older brother Ivica is a ski racer in his own right, the 2011 overall World Cup champion.  She started skiing at the age of three and began training at nine years old, and quickly became successful and won several junior competitions.

At the age of 16, Kostelić was selected for the Croatian team for the 1998 Winter Olympics in Nagano. Her best result was 8th place in the combined. She competed in all five disciplines. She won her first World Cup slalom in December 1999. Kostelić then suffered knee ligament damage which kept her out of competition until late 2000. She won the World Cup overall title that 2001 season with eight further victories.

2002 Winter Olympics
At the 2002 Winter Olympics she won three gold medals and a silver, the first Winter Olympic medals ever for an athlete from Croatia. No other female alpine racer has ever won four medals or three gold medals at a single Olympics.

Kostelić chose not to compete in the downhill and concentrated on the combined. She performed well in the downhill run and then won the gold medal after the two-run slalom. She then won a silver medal in the super-G, just behind Daniela Ceccarelli. The next race was the slalom, in which Kostelić won her second gold medal, narrowly beating Laure Péquegnot. Her final victory was in the giant slalom, a substantial 1.32 seconds ahead of silver medalist Anja Pärson.

Later career
Kostelić won the World Cup overall title again in 2003, but missed the following season due to knee surgery in October, her fourth in ten months, and thyroid surgery in January 2004. This caused 2004 to be the only year from 1998 to 2006 that she was not recognized as "Croatian Sportswoman of the Year."

After more than 18 months aways from competition, she returned to World Cup competition at Sölden and finished eighth in the giant slalom in October 2004. At the World Championships in February 2005, she won three gold medals, despite being in ill health. She won the downhill and successfully defended her world titles in slalom and combined.

In the 2006 season, Kostelić won the World Cup overall title for the third time, but also was in Top 5 in all 4 disciplines, including number 1 in slalom.  She won her first World Cup races in giant slalom (2), super-G and downhill in 2006.

At the 2006 Winter Olympics in Torino she won a gold medal in women's alpine combined. That was her fourth Olympic gold medal, making her the most successful female skier in the history of the Olympic Games. This record was set on 18 February 2006, only half an hour after Norway's Kjetil André Aamodt, winner of the men's super-G, became the first Alpine skier in men's competition to win four Olympic gold medals.

She also became the first alpine skier to win the "Sportswoman of the Year" award at the Laureus World Sports Awards in 2006, in part for her accomplishment of winning races in each discipline during the year.

Due to recurring injuries, Kostelić has not competed since the conclusion of the 2006 season. As expected, she announced her retirement a year later on 19 April 2007, citing persistent pain from her injuries.

World Cup
She won 3 overall World Cup titles: 2001, 2003 and 2006. In 2005 she was second overall, just three points behind winner Anja Pärson – the smallest difference between 1st and 2nd place in women's World Cup history. (In 2011, Maria Riesch beat Lindsey Vonn in the overall world cup by a margin of three points as well.)

Kostelić also won the slalom season title three times, the same years that she won the overall titles.  She also would have won the season trophy for the combined discipline four times (2001, 2003, 2005, 2006), but the discipline trophy for the combined was not awarded to women during her career, being added only in 2007.

She won a total of 30 World Cup races, including at least one in every discipline: 20 in slalom, 6 in combined, 2 in giant slalom, 1 in super-G, and 1 in downhill.

World Cup results

Season titles
6 titles – (3 overall, 3 slalom) plus 4 combined (unofficial)

Season standings

Race victories
30 wins – (1 DH, 1 SG, 2 GS, 20 SL, 6 K)

World Championship results

Olympic results

Personal life 
On 1 January 2019, Kostelić gave birth to her first child.

See also
List of multiple Olympic gold medalists
List of multiple Olympic gold medalists at a single Games
Ante Kostelić
List of FIS Alpine Ski World Cup women's race winners

References

External links
 
 
 

1982 births
Croatian female alpine skiers
Alpine skiers at the 1998 Winter Olympics
Alpine skiers at the 2002 Winter Olympics
Alpine skiers at the 2006 Winter Olympics
Olympic alpine skiers of Croatia
Medalists at the 2006 Winter Olympics
Medalists at the 2002 Winter Olympics
Olympic medalists in alpine skiing
Olympic gold medalists for Croatia
Olympic silver medalists for Croatia
Laureus World Sports Awards winners
FIS Alpine Ski World Cup champions
21st-century Croatian people
Sportspeople from Zagreb
Living people